Barthi may refer to:
Bartians, an Old Prussian tribe
Barthi, Bangladesh
Barthi, Punjab, town in Punjab Pakistan